Children's Healthcare of Atlanta (CHOA) sometimes simply referred to as  Children's,  is a not-for-profit children's healthcare system, located in the Atlanta area dedicated to caring for infants, children, teens, and young adults aged 0–21 throughout Georgia. CHOA formed in 1998 when Egleston Children's Health Care System and Scottish Rite Medical Center came together becoming one of the largest pediatric systems in the United States. In 2006 CHOA assumed responsibility for the management of services at Hughes Spalding Children's Hospital growing the system to three hospitals.

Today the growing pediatric healthcare system consist of the following:

Three Hospitals: Egleston Children's Hospital, Scottish Rite Children's Hospital and  Hughes Spalding Children's Hospital
Current hospital under construction: CHOA Arthur M. Blank Hospital
27 neighborhood locations throughout metro Atlanta
 Eight Urgent Care Centers and facilities that offer primary care, sports medicine, rehabilitation and surgical services
Marcus Autism Center

History 
During the 1990s the United States healthcare industry changed dramatically. Hospitals throughout the country faced colliding pressures, such as reimbursement issues, insurance coverage changes and staff shortages. 
Egleston Children's Health Care System, which included the Henrietta Egleston Hospital for Children and Scottish Rite Medical Center were among the hospitals that had struggled to continue providing care for sick and injured children and their families. Both hospitals were faced with the possibility of closure; Atlanta leaders urged Egleston and Scottish Rite to unite to preserve pediatric healthcare for the region.

Then in 1998, the two hospitals merged to form Children's Healthcare of Atlanta.  The new organization improved its standing immediately by eliminating redundancies and reducing costs.  Children's Healthcare of Atlanta Children's went on to achieve even greater financial improvements, reaching $38 million in savings in just 24 months—when the original goal had been $30 million over a five-year period. In addition to exceeding the organization's original financial targets, Children's achieved new benchmarks for customer service and employee satisfaction.

In 2006, they merged with Hughes Spalding Children's Hospital; the transaction was facilitated by a $20 million donation from philanthropist Diana Blank. During the year of 2006, Children's Healthcare of Atlanta launched a comprehensive,  five-year campaign to raise funds for the largest proposed healthcare facility expansion and renovation project in the State of Georgia's history.  Called the One to Grow On Campaign, the campaign raised a total of $294 million which surpassed the original goal of $265 million. The campaigns success was in part due to the generous support of the Atlanta area community.

In November 2020, Dwayne "The Rock" Johnson collaborated with Microsoft and billionaire Bill Gates to donate Xbox Series X consoles to Children's Healthcare of Atlanta along with 19 other children's hospitals throughout the country.

Children's Christmas parade

The Children's Christmas Parade is a major Christmas parade held to benefit Children's Healthcare of Atlanta.  Beginning in 1981 with Egleston Children's Hospital (which later merged with Scottish Rite Children's Hospital), it is held on the first Saturday in December, which is also the second weekend after Thanksgiving.

CHOA Arthur M. Blank Hospital 

Children's Healthcare Of Atlanta Arthur M. Blank Hospital (ABH) is a planned freestanding, 446-bed, pediatric acute care children's hospital currently under construction at I-85 and North Druid Hills Road in Brookhaven, Georgia. It will be affiliated with the Emory University School of Medicine and will be the flagship hospital of Children's Healthcare of Atlanta. The hospital will provide comprehensive pediatric specialties and subspecialties to infants, children, teens, and young adults aged 0–21 throughout Atlanta and will feature an level I pediatric trauma center. Its regional pediatric intensive-care unit and neonatal intensive care units will serve the Atlanta and greater Georgia region. The hospital will also has a helipad to transport critically ill patients to and from the hospital. This undertaking is the largest healthcare project in Georgia's history.

Summer camp 
Children's offers numerous specialized camps/retreats that bring together children, and teens with similar or the same medical conditions, diseases and disabilities. Some of the camps/retreats even include the whole family.  The goal each camp is to give children/teens the opportunity to have fun, meet others with similar conditions and build confidence. Many of the camps Children's offers could not be made possible without the collaboration with partner organizations and sponsors. The majority of Children's camps/retreats are held at Camp Twin Lakes, which operates several camp locations throughout the State of Georgia.

 Camp Braveheart - An overnight camp for children and teens that have had a heart transplant or are affected by heart disease
 Camp Carpe Diem - An overnight camp for children with medically controlled epilepsy and other seizure disorders
 Camp Courage -  An overnight camp for children with craniofacial disorders
 Camp Krazy Legs - An overnight summer camp for children and teens with spina bifida
 Camp No Limb-itations - An overnight camp for children and teens with amputations or limb deficiencies
 Second Chance Family Camp - A fall weekend getaway for transplant recipients, candidates and their families
 Camp Strong4Life - A week-long residential camp for children who are overweight. Two Family Weekends are also required. 
 Camp Independence - A week-long summer camp for children and teens who have been diagnosed with kidney disease, are on dialysis or have received an organ transplant
 Camp You B You - A series of summer camps for children and families affected by Autism Spectrum Disorder (ASD)

References

1998 establishments in Georgia (U.S. state)
Medical and health organizations based in Georgia (U.S. state)
Children's hospitals in the United States
Hospital networks in the United States